Mohamad Fakhrullah bin Rosli (born 8 January 1991) is a Malaysian professional footballer who plays as an attacking midfielder for Malaysia Super League club Melaka United.

References

External links
 

Living people
1991 births
People from Malacca
Malaysian people of Malay descent
Malaysian footballers
MOF F.C. players
Perlis FA players
SAMB F.C. players
Melaka United F.C. players
Association football midfielders